Erectocolliuris is a genus of beetles in the family Carabidae, containing the following species:

 Erectocolliuris camerunica Basilewsky, 1970
 Erectocolliuris cyaneolimbata (Rousseau, 1900)
 Erectocolliuris fairmairei (Gestro, 1895)
 Erectocolliuris garambae Basilewsky, 1965
 Erectocolliuris mirei Basilewsky, 1970
 Erectocolliuris wittei (Burgeon, 1937)

References

Lebiinae